The English Greyhound Derby Invitation formerly the Derby Consolation Stakes was a long standing competition for greyhounds eliminated during the later stages of the English Greyhound Derby. 

It was originally for the six greyhounds eliminated at the semi-final stage but is now for greyhounds invited by the racecourse, although this still consists largely of the eliminated semi finalists.

It was run at White City Stadium from 1927 until 1984. Following the closure of White City the event was switched to Wimbledon Stadium in 1985  and then to Towcester Greyhound Stadium in 2017. Winners over the decades have included Quare Times, Dante II, Sole Aim, Lively Band and Toms The Best.  

The race was discontinued following the closure of Towcester.

Past winners

Venues & Distances
At White City from 1936 to 1974 (over 525 yards)
At White City Stadium from 1975 to 1984 (over 500 metres)
At Wimbledon from 1985 to 2016 (over 480 metres)
At Towcester from 2017 to 2018 (over 500 metres)

Sponsors
2005-2006 William Hill
2007-2008 Blue Square
2009-2016 William Hill
2017-2018 Star Sports

References

Greyhound racing competitions in the United Kingdom
Greyhound racing in London
Sport in Northamptonshire
Recurring sporting events established in 1936
1936 establishments in England